The FIBA World Olympic Qualifying Tournament, abbreviated as FIBA World OQT, and formerly known as the FIBA Pre-Olympic Basketball Tournament, is the last qualifying tournament for the Olympic Basketball Tournament. The best non-champions from the different FIBA World zones qualify for the tournament and compete for the last remaining berths in the Summer Olympic Games.

Men's results

(*) Did not qualify for the Summer Olympics.

Women's results

References

External links 
Pre-Olympic Basketball Tournament results
2008 FIBA Olympic Qualifying Tournament for Men

 
Basketball at the Summer Olympics – Men's qualification
Olympics